Turowicz is a Polish surname. Notable people with the surname include:

Jerzy Turowicz (1912–1999), Polish journalist
Władysław Turowicz (1908–1980), Polish-Pakistani pilot and engineer

See also
Turovice
Turka (disambiguation)
Turkovich

Polish-language surnames